Mannheim/22nd was a rapid transit station on the Chicago "L" between 1930 and 1951. Located on the Westchester branch, it was the southern terminus of that branch, which was extended south to the station's location after having opened in 1926.

History
The Westchester branch opened in 1926, and was extended south to Mannheim and 22nd Streets on December 1, 1930. This extension was served by a single car that shuttled passengers to and from Roosevelt; this was replaced in 1933 by a through-car service that coupled and uncoupled from Westchester trains at Roosevelt.

The branch continued in service until replaced by bus service on December 9, 1951.

Station details
The station had a single platform on the east side of the single track. Originally there was a station house and an office for the real estate developer for Westchester on the platform, but these were removed between 1939 and 1946.

Ridership
Detailed ridership statistics were never collected for Mannheim/22nd; such statistics were collected for the Westchester branch as a whole, or for more patronized stations on the branch.

References

Works cited

External links
A narrated late 1940s/early 1950s view of a train approaching the Mannheim/22nd station

Defunct Chicago "L" stations
1930 establishments in Illinois
1951 disestablishments in Illinois
Railway stations opened in 1930
Railway stations closed in 1951